Gogolevka is a rural locality (a village) in Verkhneyaushevsky Selsoviet, Fyodorovsky District, Bashkortostan, Russia. The population was 36 as of 2010. There are 2 streets.

Geography 
Gogolevka is located 11 km east of Fyodorovka (the district's administrative centre) by road. Verkhneyaushevo is the nearest rural locality.

References 

Rural localities in Fyodorovsky District